Rudolf Püngeler (15 February 1857 in Burtscheid – 1 February 1927 in Aachen) was a German entomologist who specialised in Lepidoptera. 
He was a district court lawyer in Aachen.

Püngeler described very many new species and named ten new genera of moths mainly in Deutsche Entomologische Zeitschrift, Iris. Dresden. His most important work was on the Lepidoptera of Central Asia and China. His collection of Palaearctic Lepidoptera is in the Berlin Museum für Naturkunde.

Works
 Diagnosen neuer Lepidopteren aus Centralasien. In: Societas Entomologica. Bd. 13, Nr. 8, 1898, S. 57–58, online.
 Neue Macrolepidopteren aus Centralasien. In: Deutsche entomologische Zeitschrift. Lepidopterologische Hefte. Bd. 14, 1901, S. 177–191, Taf. 1–3.
 Neue Macrolepidopteren aus Centralasien. In: Societas Entomologica. Bd. 19, Nr. 16, 1904, S. 121–122, Nr. 17, 130–131, online.
 Püngeler, R. 1904. Neue palaearctische Macrolepidopteren. - Deutsche entomologische Zeitschrift Iris 16: 286-301.
 Neue paläarktische Macrolepidopteren. In: Deutsche entomologische Zeitschrift „Iris“. Bd. 19, 1906, S. 78–98.
 Neue paläarktische Macrolepidopteren. In: Deutsche entomologische Zeitschrift „Iris“. Bd. 28, 1914, S. 37–62.
 6. Arctia wagneri Püng. nov. spec. In: Fritz Wagner: Einige alte und neue europäisch-palaearktische Lepidopteren. In: Zeitschrift des Österreichischen Entomologischen Vereines Wien. Bd. 3, S. 1918, S. 43–47, hier S. 46, online (PDF; 9,1 MB).
 Verzeichnis der bisher in der Umgegend Aachens gefundenen Macro-Lepidoptera. In: Deutsche entomologische Zeitschrift „Iris“. Bd. 51, 1937, S. 1–100, (posthum, Originalmanuskript von 1888 bis 1927).

References
Pfaff, G. & Wrede, O. H. 1934 [Püngeler, R.]  Festschrift, 50jähriges Bestehen I.E.V. DEI.

External links
DEI biografi Portrait Reference List.

Notes 

German lepidopterists
1857 births
1927 deaths